Lay Nưa is a commune (xã) of Mường Lay in Điện Biên Province, northwestern Vietnam.

Communes of Điện Biên province
Populated places in Điện Biên province